Colin Sullivan is an Australian physician, professor, and inventor known for his invention of the nasal Continuous Positive Airway Pressure (CPAP) circuit, made of continuous flow machine and vented nasal mask, in June 1980.

Sullivan’s development of the nasal CPAP was a product of his long-term interest in the upper respiratory airway and its role in SIDS (aka crib death or cot death).
Prior to the invention of the nasal CPAP machine sleep apnea was often treated with radical measures such as tracheotomy.

In 2009 Prof. Sullivan was awarded an Officer of the Order of Australia Award for "service to medicine as an innovator in the field of sleep disorders and the development of equipment and treatment practices".

References 

Living people
20th-century Australian inventors
Sydney Medical School alumni
Fellows of the Australian Academy of Science
Year of birth missing (living people)
Australian paediatricians